Mikkel Bruhn (born 16 October 1990) is a Danish footballer.

Career

Club career
On 22 August 2019, Bruhn joined Danish 1st Division club Næstved BK on a loan deal for the rest of the season. Bruhn then joined Hvidovre IF on 2 September 2020. However, his contract was terminated by mutual consent on 13 January 2021.

References

External links
https://www.brondbystats.dk/Person/Details/8382 at Brøndby Stats

Danish men's footballers
1990 births
Living people
FC Helsingør players
Næstved Boldklub players
Hvidovre IF players
Danish 1st Division players
Danish Superliga players
Association football goalkeepers
FC Nordsjælland players
Danish 2nd Division players
Allerød FK players